John Mark Robinson (born 19 July 1948) is an entrepreneur, director, and actor. Films he directed have included Roadhouse 66, Kid, and All Tied Up. He also directed the music videos for various musical artists. Robinson is the owner and operator of Vancouver Prop & Costume, having previously served as president of Modern Props. Robinson holds Patent No. 10,277,960 for his co-invention of a method and system for seeding video programs with episodic interactive items.

Early life
Robinson was born in Toronto, Ontario. He graduated from the American Academy of Dramatic Arts in New York.

Music, television, and film career
Robinson founded the Modern Productions in 1980 to direct and produce music videos for artists under the banner. In 1983, he directed Roadhouse 66, starring Willem Dafoe, released by Universal Pictures. In 1990, he directed the movie Kid released by Focus Features. Robinson directed the television show Martha Stewart Living in 1991. He also directed the movie Motowns Mustang in 1992 and All Tied Up in 1993. 

During his career, Robinson has directed and produced music videos for Bob Dylan ("Sweetheart Like You"), Bob Marley ("Redemption Song"), Pretenders, Tina Turner ("What's Love Got to Do with It?"), Ramones ("Rock 'n' Roll High School"), Santana ("Hold On"), Pat Benatar, and George Thorogood ("Bad to the Bone").

Design career
Robinson is also a design professional, having served as president of Modern Props in both Los Angeles and Vancouver. He is the owner and operator of Vancouver Prop & Costume in Vancouver, British Columbia, as well as a partner in the Milanese a kitchen and bath design company Boffi Los Angeles.  Vancouver Prop & Costume rents props and costumes for use in motion pictures, commercials, and television. Robinson has assembled tens of thousands of pieces that can be used. He purchased the selection of props from 20th Century Fox in 2005, and has continued to build the collection. He later founded Tap Media Labs, a company that adds content information to online videos for viewers, based in Vancouver and Los Angeles.

Personal life
Robinson married Linda DeScenna in 2017.

Discography

Music videos

Credits

References

1948 births
Living people
American male actors
American directors
American Academy of Dramatic Arts alumni
Male actors from Toronto
American music video directors